Dolomedes boiei, is a species of spider of the genus Dolomedes. It is native to Java and Sri Lanka.

See also 
 List of Pisauridae species

References

boiei
Spiders of Asia
Spiders described in 1859